Samia Medjahdi (born 6 January 1985) is a retired Algerian tennis player.

Medjahdi has a WTA singles career high ranking of 370 achieved on 7 August 2006. She also has a WTA doubles career high ranking of 505 achieved on 29 August 2005. Medjahdi has won one ITF doubles title.

Playing for Algeria in Fed Cup, Medjahdi has a W/L record of 8–7.

ITF finals (1–4)

Singles (0–1)

Doubles (1–3)

ITF Junior Finals

Singles Finals (1–0)

National representation

Fed Cup
Medjahdi made her Fed Cup debut for Algeria in 2003, while the team was competing in the Europe/Africa Zone Group II, when she was 18 years and 114 days old.

Fed Cup (8–7)

Singles (7–4)

Doubles (1–3)

External links 
 
 
 

1985 births
Living people
Algerian female tennis players
African Games gold medalists for Algeria
African Games medalists in tennis
African Games bronze medalists for Algeria
Competitors at the 2007 All-Africa Games
Competitors at the 2011 All-Africa Games
21st-century Algerian people